Darko Stanić (born 8 October 1978) is a Serbian/Qatari former handball player for the Al Rayyan and the Qatari national team. He was dubbed the "Minister of Defence" due to his performances for the Serbia national team.

Club career
After making his EHF Champions League debut with Crvena zvezda, Stanić moved abroad to Switzerland and joined TV Suhr in early 2005. He spent the next season at fellow Swiss club Grasshoppers. In April 2006, Stanić tested positive for cocaine after a play-off match with St. Gallen. He consequently received a six-month ban from handball. However, the ban was eventually extended for a period of two years, starting on 22 May 2006.

After serving his two-year suspension, Stanić signed with Slovenian club Koper in May 2008. He spent three seasons in Slovenia, before moving to Macedonian side Metalurg Skopje. Later on, Stanić also briefly played in Germany (SG BBM Bietigheim and Rhein-Neckar Löwen), Kuwait (Kuwait SC), and Qatar (El Jaish and Al Sadd and Al Rayyan).

International career
Stanić made his major international debut for Serbia at the 2009 World Championship. He was later an integral part of the team that won the silver medal at the 2012 European Championship, being named the tournament's best goalkeeper. Stanić also participated in the 2012 Summer Olympics.

Honours
Crvena zvezda
 Serbia and Montenegro Handball Super League: 2003–04
 Serbia and Montenegro Handball Cup: 2003–04
Koper
 Slovenian First League: 2010–11
 Slovenian Cup: 2008–09, 2010–11
Metalurg Skopje
 Macedonian Handball Super League: 2011–12, 2013–14
 Macedonian Handball Cup: 2012–13
El Jaish
 Qatar Handball League: 2015–16
 Qatar Handball Cup: 2015–16

References

External links
 Olympic record
 
 

1978 births
Living people
People from Mojkovac
Serbs of Montenegro
Serbia and Montenegro male handball players
Serbian male handball players
Olympic handball players of Serbia
Handball players at the 2012 Summer Olympics
RK Crvena zvezda players
Rhein-Neckar Löwen players
Handball-Bundesliga players
Expatriate handball players
Serbia and Montenegro expatriate sportspeople in Switzerland
Serbian expatriate sportspeople in Slovenia
Serbian expatriate sportspeople in North Macedonia
Serbian expatriate sportspeople in Germany
Serbian expatriate sportspeople in Qatar
Doping cases in handball
Serbian sportspeople in doping cases